Lanston may refer to:

 Tolbert Lanston (1844–1913), the American founder of monotype.
 Lanston Monotype Company
 Lansoprazole, a medication which reduces stomach acid

See also
Langston